The Chicago metropolitan area (the Chicago market) commands the third-largest media market in the United States after New York City and Los Angeles and the largest inland market. All of the major U.S. television networks have subsidiaries in Chicago. WGN-TV, which is owned by the Tribune Media Company, is carried (with some programming differences) as "WGN America" on cable and satellite nationwide. Sun-Times Media Group is also headquartered in Chicago, which, along with Tribune Publishing, are some the largest owners of daily newspapers in the country.

History
Journalists, novelists, architects, engineers, business tycoons, scientists, poets, sports teams, criminals, and millions of laborers shaped Chicago's national and international reputation. Images and representations are important means by which the city is known and negotiated. During the years of rapid urbanization between 1890 and 1930, numerous daily newspapers presented the most important and pervasive versions of the city. 

Among the significant innovations of Chicago's newspapers in these years that shaped the idea of the city was the emergence of the local color columnist. Groeninger (2005) examines the role of columnists in Chicago newspapers in creating a "city of the mind." After a review of the literature on images of cities, the relationship of newspapers to modern city life in the thought of Robert Park, and the world of Chicago's newspapers at the turn of the 20th century, detailed studies of a number of the most important columnists of the era follow. George Ade's column of the 1890s in the Daily News, "Stories of the Streets and of the Town," presented a view of Chicago from the perspective of migrants from the small towns of the Midwest. In the same decade Finley Peter Dunne's column in the Evening Post, featuring the fictional Irish barkeeper, Mr. Dooley, offered readers a literary version of the Irish working-class neighborhood of Bridgeport. Ring Lardner's Tribune sports column of the teens, "In the Wake of the News," satirized not only Chicagoans obsession with sports, but also the middle-class culture of opera, musical theater, and the newspaper itself. Several columns in the black newspaper, The Whip, offered images of Bronzeville in the 1920s that both reflected and helped shape the experience of African-Americans on the South Side of Chicago. Ben Hecht's "1001 Afternoons in Chicago" column in the Daily News expressed a new, anti-Victorian sensibility in the post-war era, but his most enduring contributions to the image of Chicago were on the stage and in the new medium of film. The columnists who wrote about everyday life in the city were the most distinctive and powerful newspaper voices in shaping the idea of Chicago and the civic personality of the city itself.

Newspapers
Two major daily newspapers are published in Chicago, the Chicago Tribune and the Chicago Sun-Times. The former has the larger circulation. There are also a number of regional and special-interest newspapers such as the Daily Herald (Arlington Heights), SouthtownStar, the Chicago Defender, RedEye, Third Coast Press and the Chicago Reader.

Daily

Chicago Sun-Times
Chicago Tribune

Weekly
Chicago Crusader
Chicago Defender
Chicago News
Chicago Reader
N'Digo
Newcity
RedEye

Community

Austin Voice
 Austin Weekly News
Back-of-Yards Journal
Beverly News
Beverly Review
Bridgeport News
Brighton Park Life
Bulgaria SEGA Newspaper (Bulgarian Community Newspaper - Est 2005)
Chicago Citizen Newspapers
Chicago News Russian - Новости Чикаго
Chicago Free Press
The Chicago Independent Bulletin
Chicago Journal
The Chicago Maroon
Chicago Shimpo
Chicago Standard
Clear Ridge Reporter
 Dziennik Związkowy (Polish Daily News)
Edgebrook Times
Edison Review
Exito
Extra
The Gate
The Gazette
Greek Star
Hyde Park Herald
Inside-Booster
Korean News
Korean Times
La Raza
La Voz de Chicago
Lawndale News
Logan Square Times
Lumpen
McKinley Park Life
Mt. Greenwood Express
Nadig Press-Journal
Near North News
New Metro News
News-Star
North Lawndale Community News
North Loop News
Northwest Leader-Post
Norwood Review
River North News
Sauganash Sounds
Scottsdale Independent
Shoreland News
Skyline
Super Express USA
Third Coast Press
Tri-City Journal
Ukrainske Slovo (Ukrainian Community Newspaper - Est 2002)
Westside Journal
World Journal

Business, legal, entertainment and other local periodicals
Bar Fly
Chicago magazine
Chicago Computer Guide
Chicago Daily Law Bulletin
Chicago Educator
Chicago Innerview
Chicago Journal of International Law
Chicago Life
Chicago Parent
The Chicago Reporter
Chicagoland Golf
Crain's Chicago Business
Jettison Quarterly
PerformInk
South Shore Parent
Third Coast Review
Time Out Chicago
UR Chicago
Windy City Times

Defunct newspapers
Chicago Conservator
Chicago Daily News
Chicago Free Press
Chicago Inter Ocean
Chicago's American
Denní Hlasatel 
Gay Chicago
Gay Chicago News
Red Streak
Southeast Chicago Observer

Broadcast radio
The Chicago metropolitan area is currently the third-largest radio market in the United States as ranked by Nielsen Media Research. The following list includes full-power stations licensed to Chicago proper, in addition to area suburbs.

Currently, radio stations that primarily serve the Chicago metropolitan area include:

AM stations
 560 WIND Chicago (Conservative talk)
 640 WMFN Peotone (Polish/dance)
 670 WSCR Chicago (Sports)1
 720 WGN Chicago (Talk)1
 750 WNDZ Portage, IN (Brokered)
 780 WBBM Chicago (All-news)1
 820 WCPT Willow Springs (Progressive talk)
 890 WLS Chicago (Conservative talk)1
 930 WKBM Sandwich (Relevant Radio)
 950 WNTD Chicago (Relevant Radio)
 1000 WMVP Chicago (Sports)1
 1030 WNVR Vernon Hills (Polish)
 1080 WNWI Oak Lawn (Ethnic)
 1110 WXES Chicago (ESNE Radio)2
 1160 WYLL Chicago (Christian)
 1200 WRTO Chicago (Spanish sports)
 1220 WKRS Waukegan (Spanish sports)
 1230 WJOB Hammond, IN (Talk/sports)
 1240 WSBC Chicago (Variety)
 1270 WWCA Gary, IN (Relevant Radio)
 1300 WRDZ La Grange (Polish)
 1320 WKAN Kankakee (Talk)
 1330 WKTA Evanston (Ethnic)
 1340 WJOL Joliet (Talk)
 1370 WLTH Gary, IN (Community)
 1390 WGRB Chicago (Gospel)
 1410 WRMN Elgin (Talk)
 1420 WIMS Michigan City (Talk/classic hits)
 1490 WEUR Oak Park (Polish/ethnic)
 1500 WAKE Valparaiso, IN (Oldies)
 1500 WPJX Zion (Heavy metal)
 1510 WWHN Joliet (Urban AC)2
 1530 WCKG Elmhurst (Sports)2
 1570 WBGX Harvey (Gospel)
 1590 WCGO Evanston (Talk/Korean/Russian)
 1690 WVON Berwyn (Urban talk)

 1 clear-channel station
 2 daytime-only station

FM stations
Asterisk (*) indicates a non-commercial (public radio/campus/educational) broadcast.
 87.7 WRME-LD Chicago (Oldies) 
 88.1 WCRX Chicago (College/dance/CHR/hip hop)* 
 88.1 WLRA Lockport (College/variety)*
 88.3 WZRD Chicago (College/freeform)*
 88.3 WXAV Chicago (College/variety)*
 88.5 WHPK Hyde Park (College/variety)*
 88.7 WLUW Chicago (Campus/Community)* 
 88.9 WMXM Lake Forest (College/variety)*
 89.1 WOKL Round Lake Beach (K-Love)* 
 89.1 WONC Naperville (College/Album-oriented rock)* 
 89.3 WNUR-FM Evanston (College/variety)*
 89.7 WONU Kankakee (Contemporary Christian)* 
 90.1 WMBI-FM Chicago (Moody Radio)* 
 90.9 WDCB Glen Ellyn (NPR/jazz)*
 91.1 WBEW Chesterton, Indiana (Urban contemporary)*
 91.5 WBEZ Chicago (NPR/talk)*
 91.7 WZKL Woodstock (K-Love)* 
 92.3 WPWX Hammond, IN (Mainstream urban) 
 92.5 WCLR DeKalb (K-Love)* 
 92.7 WCPY Arlington Heights (Polish/dance) 
 93.1 WXRT Chicago (Adult album alternative) 
 93.5 WVIV-FM Lemont (Spanish CHR) 
 93.9 WLIT-FM Chicago (Soft AC) 
 94.3 WAWE Glendale Heights (Air1)* 
 94.7 WLS-FM Chicago (Classic hits) 
 95.1 WIIL Union Grove, WI (Active rock) 
 95.5 WCHI-FM Chicago (Mainstream rock) 
 95.9 WERV-FM Aurora (Classic hits) 
 96.3 WBBM-FM Chicago (Contemporary hit radio) 
 96.7 WSSR Joliet (Hot AC) 
 96.9 WWDV Zion (Classic rock) 
 97.1 WDRV Chicago (Classic rock) 
 97.9 WCKL Chicago (K-Love)* 
 98.3 WCCQ Crest Hill (Classic country) 
 98.7 WFMT Chicago (Classical) 
 99.5 WUSN Chicago (Country) 
 99.9 WYHI Park Forest (BBN)* 
 100.3 WSHE-FM Chicago (Adult contemporary) 
 100.7 WRXQ Coal City (Classic rock) 
 101.1 WKQX Chicago (Alternative rock) 
 101.9 WTMX Skokie (Hot AC) 
 102.3 WXLC Waukegan (Hot AC) 
 102.3 WYCA Crete (Gospel) 
 102.7 WVAZ Oak Park (Urban AC) 
 103.1 WPNA-FM Highland Park (Polish music) 
 103.5 WKSC-FM Chicago (Contemporary hit radio) 
 104.3 WBMX Chicago (Classic hip hop) 
 104.7 WCFL Morris (Contemporary Christian)* 
 105.1 WOJO Evanston (Regional Mexican) 
 105.9 WCFS-FM Elmwood Park (All-news) 
 106.3 WSRB Lansing (Urban AC) 
 107.5 WGCI-FM Chicago (Urban contemporary) 
 107.9 WLEY-FM Aurora (Regional Mexican)

Television 
The Chicago metropolitan area is currently defined by Nielsen Media Research as the third-largest television market in the United States, with all of the major U.S. television networks having affiliates serving the region. As of October 2022, it is the largest US television market of which at least one station carrying commercial network programming is not owned by a particular network's parent company.

Currently, television stations that primarily serve the Chicago metropolitan area include:

Broadcast
 2 WBBM-TV Chicago (CBS)*
 5 WMAQ-TV Chicago (NBC)*
 7 WLS-TV Chicago (ABC)*
 9 WGN-TV Chicago (Nexstar)
 11 WTTW Chicago (PBS)
 13 WOCK-CD Chicago (Shop LC)
 23 WWME-CD Chicago (MeTV)*
 24 WPVN-CD Chicago (Azteca América)*
 26 WCIU-TV Chicago (The CW)
 32 WFLD Chicago (Fox)*
 34 WEDE-CD Arlington Heights (Independent)
 35 WWTO-TV Naperville (TBN)*
 38 WCPX-TV Chicago (Ion Television)*
 40 WESV-LD Chicago (Estrella TV)*
 44 WSNS-TV Chicago (Telemundo)*
 48 WMEU-CD Chicago (Independent)
 50 WPWR-TV Gary, IN (MyNetworkTV)*
 60 WXFT-DT Aurora (UniMás)*
 61 WCHU-LD Oakwood Hills (Infomercials)
 62 WJYS Hammond, IN (Independent)
 66 WGBO-DT Joliet (Univision)*
Asterisk (*) indicates channel is a network owned-and-operated station.

Cable
 Chicago Access Network Television
 Chicagoland Television
 NBC Sports Chicago
 NewsNation

Government cable channels for Chicago are also carried on channels  23, 25, and 49.

Although EVINE Live does have over-the-air affiliates, it is not available via broadcast television in Chicago; however, is available on Comcast on channels 89 and 164 and RCN channel 193 in the Chicago market.

Online
Better (formerly Make It Better)
The Beachwood Reporter
Block Club Chicago
Chicago Daily Observer
City Bureau
Chicagoist (part of the Gothamist network – now defunct)
ChicagoNow (Chicago Tribune-owned weblog community) 
DNAinfo Chicago (defunct)Gapers BlockHuffington Post Chicago (local edition of Huffington Post)
Injustice WatchPatch.com Chicago NetworkReddit ChicagoSouth Side WeeklyChicago Morning StarThird Coast Review''

Media corporations
Sun-Times Media Group
Tribune Media

See also
City News Bureau of Chicago
I Am Chicago
Newspapers of the Chicago metropolitan area

References

External links
Film In Chicago
Chicago Film Office
Illinois Film Office
Chicago Media List
Chicago, IL on American Radio Map (Radiomap.us)

Chicago